A trichotomy is a three-way classificatory division. Some philosophers pursued trichotomies.

History
Important trichotomies discussed by Aquinas include the causal principles (agent, patient, act), the potencies for the intellect (imagination, cogitative power, and memory and reminiscence), and the acts of the intellect (concept, judgment, reasoning), with all of those rooted in Aristotle; also the transcendentals of being (unity, truth, goodness) and the requisites of the beautiful (wholeness, harmony, radiance).

Kant expounded a table of judgments involving four three-way alternatives, in regard to (1) Quantity, (2) Quality, (3) Relation, (4) Modality, and, based thereupon, a table of four categories, named by the terms just listed, and each with three subcategories. Kant also adapted the Thomistic acts of intellect in his trichotomy of higher cognition—(a) understanding, (b) judgment, (c) reason—which he correlated with his adaptation in the soul's capacities—(a) cognitive faculties, (b) feeling of pleasure or displeasure, and (c) faculty of desire—of Tetens's trichotomy of feeling, understanding, will. In his Logic (113) Kant notes that all "polytomy are empirical" and "cannot be taught in logic".

Hegel held that a thing's or idea's internal contradiction leads in a dialectical process to a new synthesis that makes better sense of the contradiction. The process is sometimes described as thesis, antithesis, synthesis. It is instanced across a pattern of trichotomies (e.g. being-nothingness-becoming, immediate-mediate-concrete, abstract-negative-concrete); such trichotomies are not just three-way classificatory divisions; they involve trios of elements functionally interrelated in a process. They are often called triads (but 'triad' does not have that as a fixed sense in philosophy generally).

Charles Sanders Peirce built his philosophy on trichotomies and triadic relations and processes, and framed the "Reduction Thesis" that every predicate is essentially either monadic (quality), dyadic (relation of reaction or resistance), or triadic (representational relation), and never genuinely and irreducibly tetradic or larger.

Examples of philosophical trichotomies

See also
Balanced ternary
Dichotomy
Epistemological pluralism
Rule of three (writing)
Trilemma
Trinity
Tripartite motto

Notes

History of philosophy
Classification systems
3 (number)